Kunegunde Hergot (died 7 February 1547) was a German printer in Nuremberg and the wife of first Hans Hergot, and later of Georg Wachter, both printers.

It is believed that she printed much of the material printed under Hans Hergot's name, and that he was simply the distributor. The materials he was distributing were considered heretical and politically radical, and while George, Duke of Saxony presided, Hans Hergot was tried and condemned to death. Kunegunde tried to convince the Nuremberg city council to intercede, but was unsuccessful, and Hans was publicly executed in 1527. Kunegunde continued the business under her own name until 1538.

See also
 List of women printers and publishers before 1800

References

Notes

German printers
1547 deaths
Year of birth unknown
Women printers
16th-century German businesswomen
16th-century printers